Charisma Carpenter (born July 23, 1970) is an American actress. She played Cordelia Chase in the supernatural drama series Buffy the Vampire Slayer (1997–1999) and its spin-off series Angel (1999–2004). She also starred as Kyra in Charmed (2004), Kendall Casablancas in Veronica Mars (2005–2006), Rebecca Sewell in The Lying Game (2012–2013), and Lacy in The Expendables film series (2010–2012).

Early life
Carpenter was born in Las Vegas, Nevada, the daughter of Christine, a bird sanctuary worker, and Don Carpenter, a salesman. She is of Spanish (from her maternal grandfather), French, and German descent. Carpenter attended Bishop Gorman High School in Las Vegas; she was also a part of a song-and-dance troupe which performed in the Las Vegas Valley when she was nine years old.

When Carpenter was 15, her family moved to Rosarito Beach, Baja California, Mexico and then to San Diego, California. She attended Bonita Vista High School and Chula Vista School of the Creative and Performing Arts. After graduation, Carpenter traveled throughout Europe. When she returned to San Diego, she worked as a video store clerk, an aerobics instructor, and in property management. In 1991, she worked as a cheerleader for the San Diego Chargers football team. In 1992, she moved to Los Angeles.

While swimming in San Diego in 1991, she and two male friends were attacked by Henry Hubbard Jr., a former San Diego police officer and serial rapist, who attempted to subdue them at gunpoint. During the struggle, both her friends and Hubbard were shot, forcing him to flee the scene; both friends survived the attack. Hubbard was arrested, convicted, and sentenced to 56 years in prison for a series of rapes and robberies. Carpenter brought Hubbard's police-issue flashlight from the beach, which he had left at the scene, and the flashlight became a key piece of evidence used against him.

Career
Carpenter was discovered by a commercial agent while waiting tables in Los Angeles to save money for her college education. This led to her role on theatrical productions and more than twenty commercials. She made her first television role in 1994 by appearing in an episode of Baywatch. Shortly after that, she landed a starring role in the NBC short-lived teen drama/soap opera series Malibu Shores.

In 1996, Carpenter auditioned for the title role in The WB supernatural drama series Buffy the Vampire Slayer but instead was cast as Cordelia Chase, a snobby and popular high school student. After three seasons on Buffy the Vampire Slayer, Carpenter was offered an even larger role as the same character on the spin-off series Angel alongside David Boreanaz. She played Cordelia Chase for four seasons on Angel. Although her character leaves the series during Angels fourth season, Carpenter returned for the 100th episode in the fifth and final season.

In 2004, Carpenter had a guest appearance in The WB fantasy drama series Charmed as a psychic demon named Kyra for three episodes and played a recurring role on NBC's Miss Match, appearing in four episodes. She also had a recurring role as Kendall Casablancas in the UPN mystery drama series Veronica Mars for the 2005–06 season, appearing in 11 episodes. Carpenter guest-starred in the first-season finale of the ABC Family comedy-drama series Greek and reprised her role for two episodes of Season 2. According to TV Guide in September 2007, she was set to join the cast of The Apprentice: Celebrity Edition, but instead she chose to do a guest appearance in the Fox comedy series Back to You as well as a two episode role on the short-lived series Big Shots. Carpenter also had a guest appearance in an April 2009 episode of CSI: Crime Scene Investigation entitled "The Descent of Man".

On March 20, 2008, Paley Fest hosted a Buffy the Vampire Slayer reunion. Carpenter attended the event alongside Buffy creator Joss Whedon, producers Marti Noxon and David Greenwalt, and other Buffy alumni including Sarah Michelle Gellar, Nicholas Brendon, James Marsters, Emma Caulfield, Amber Benson, Seth Green, and Michelle Trachtenberg.

Carpenter has starred in an assortment of made-for-TV and direct-to-video films including the sex comedy What Boys Like, the horror film Voodoo Moon, and the romantic comedies See Jane Date and Relative Chaos on ABC Family (the latter of which co-starred fellow Buffy alum Nicholas Brendon). She also appeared in the original films Flirting with Danger and Cheaters' Club (both 2006) both on Lifetime and the Syfy original film House of Bones broadcast in 2010, around the same time as her guest spot in Legend of the Seeker.

In 2009, Carpenter starred in production company Red Sparrow's first film, Psychosis, which was released on January 11, 2011. In August 2010, she had a supporting role in Sylvester Stallone's The Expendables. After the success of The Expendables, Carpenter was cast in Human Factor and in the indie thriller Crash Site. She appeared in an episode of the seventh season of Supernatural alongside Buffy co-star James Marsters. In 2012, Carpenter landed a recurring role as Rebecca Sewell in the first season of ABC Family drama series The Lying Game. She was upgraded to a series regular for the second season. Later in the same year, she reprised her role as Lacy in The Expendables 2.

On August 28, 2013, Surviving Evil (original working title: I Survived Evil) debuted on Investigation Discovery, with Carpenter as host; in the premiere episode, Carpenter herself was featured as a crime survivor, revisiting the horrific attack she and two friends suffered at the hands of violent serial rapist and police officer Henry Hubbard Jr. on San Diego's Torrey Pines State Beach in 1991. She starred in the 2015 erotic film Bound, alongside Morgan Obenreder, which received a lukewarm reception. She later led the television film Mommy's Secret.

In February 2021, Carpenter spoke out against director Joss Whedon in support of Ray Fisher who also claimed to have experienced a toxic environment at the hands of the director. She accused him of dismissing her from Angel because of her pregnancy.

Public image
Carpenter was named No. 31 on AskMen's Top 99 Most Desirable Women 2002 and No. 44 on their 2005 list. Despite this, Carpenter has stated she does not view herself as a sex symbol.

Carpenter appeared on the cover and in a ten-page nude pictorial of the June 2004 issue of Playboy magazine. When she was asked by People magazine in 2005 whether she would ever pose for Playboy again, she replied, "I don't know. I did Playboy for a very specific reason. Not only was it a good financial move, but it was about the place I was at in my life. I had just had my son and I'd gained 50 pounds during pregnancy. I wanted to get back to my old self. I wanted to feel desirable and sexy. So I thought, 'What if I went full throttle'?"

Personal life
Carpenter married Damian Hardy on October 5, 2002, in her hometown of Las Vegas. In March 2003, Carpenter gave birth to a son, Donovan Charles Hardy. In late 2007, the couple separated and their divorce was finalized on July 8, 2008. Carpenter is Catholic.

Filmography

Film

Television

Video games
 Buffy the Vampire Slayer (2002); as Cordelia Chase (voice role)

References

External links

 
 

1970 births
20th-century American actresses
21st-century American actresses
Actresses from Las Vegas
American cheerleaders
American film actresses
American people of French descent
American people of German descent
American people of Spanish descent
American Roman Catholics
American television actresses
Bishop Gorman High School alumni
Catholics from Nevada
Hispanic and Latino American actresses
Living people
National Football League cheerleaders
People from Chula Vista, California